Thieves is the second studio album by Australian indie rock band British India, released on 19 July 2008, but also sold early by the band at album launch parties. The album was co-produced by Harry Vanda and Glenn Goldsmith. It peaked at No. 5 on the ARIA Albums Chart.

Thieves was selected as Triple J's Feature Album in that month, beating both The Vines' album Melodia as well as The Living End's album White Noise. At the ARIA Music Awards of 2008 it was nominated for Best Independent Release.

Track listing

Some tracks are titled slightly differently inside the booklet compared with the back inlay. For instance, "You Will Die and I Will Take Over" is listed as "You Will Die, I Will Take Over" and "The Golden Years" is listed as "The Golden Years (Angel Complication)" and on iTunes "God Is Dead (Meet the Kids)" is listed as "God Is Dead, Meet the Kids".

Personnel 
 Will Drummond – bass guitar
 Declan Melia – vocals, guitar
 Matt O’Gorman – drums
 Nic Wilson – guitar

Charts

Release history

References

External links
British India's Myspace

2008 albums
British India (band) albums
Shock Records albums
Albums produced by Harry Vanda